The Syro-Malabar Catholic Eparchy of Ramanathapuram is situated in Ramanathapuram locality in Coimbatore of Tamil Nadu. The eparchy includes Coimbatore, Tirupur, Erode and Karur districts. Its territory is extended  to Salem and Trichy on 10-10-2017. The eparchy of Ramanathapuram was created in 2010 by bifurcating the Syro-Malabar Catholic eparchy of Palghat.  The present Bishop of Ramanathapuram is Mar Paul Alappat.  Holy Trinity Church, Ramanathapuram is the cathedral of the eparchy and the bishop's residence is also at Ramanathapuram. The eparchy is a suffragan of the Syro-Malabar Catholic Archeparchy of Thrissur. 
The diocese was created by Mar Varkey Cardinal Vithayathil, by his decree on 18 January 2010.  The eparchy has an area of 18,525 km2 with a total population of 89, 24,717 of which around 15,694 are Syro-Malabar Catholics.

References

Eastern Catholic dioceses in India
Archdiocese of Thrissur
Syro-Malabar Catholic dioceses
Christian organizations established in 2010
Roman Catholic dioceses and prelatures established in the 21st century
2010 establishments in Kerala